The Lady Is a Tramp is a television programme in the situation comedy format that was one of the first series to be shown on the then-new British television channel, Channel 4, between 1983 and 1984. (It started on 8 January 1983; the channel had begun broadcasting only the previous November.)

Written by Johnny Speight, the programme lasted for two series, and totalled 13 episodes.

Synopsis
Old Pat and Lanky Pat are a pair of elderly tramps or "bag ladies" who have spent many years sleeping rough in such places as on park benches in London.

The two move into a derelict van in an apparently unused yard. They then resist repeated attempts to move them from their new home.

Chief characters and actresses
 Old Pat — played by Patricia Hayes
 Lanky Pat — played by Pat Coombs

The character of Old Pat echoes the title role in the Jeremy Sandford drama "Edna the Inebriate Woman" which Hayes had played in 1971, but is done with a greater sense of comedy. According to her autobiography, Hayes used costume items from her performance as Edna in the role of Old Pat.

Crew
 Directors: Douglas Argent & Dennis Main Wilson
 Writer: Johnny Speight

References

External links

See also
 Homelessness
 Lady and the Tramp (animated feature film)

1983 British television series debuts
1984 British television series endings
1980s British sitcoms
Channel 4 sitcoms
English-language television shows